The Ministry of Energy and Mineral Development, also Ministry of Energy, Oil and Mineral Development is one of the governmental bodies of Uganda. The ministry has the function of developing and implementing policies related to electricity, minerals, petroleum and petroleum products. The ministry is part of the national cabinet and is headed by a cabinet minister. The current Cabinet Minister of Energy is [Hon. Ruth Ssentamu Nankabirwa].

Location
The headquarters of the ministry are located in Amber House on Kampala Road in the Kampala Central Division in Kampala, the capital and largest city of the country. The coordinates of the headquarters are 0°18'48.0"N, 32°34'55.0"E (Latitude:0°18'48.0"N; Longitude:32°34'55.0"E)

Scope of activities
The ministry is responsible for energy policy, investments in mining, and the establishment of new power generating infrastructure using hydro power, thermal power, solar power, wind power and nuclear power. The two largest power development projects in the country are the 183 megawatt Isimba Hydroelectric Power Station, expected online in 2016, and the 600 megawatt Karuma Hydroelectric Power Station, expected online in 2018. According to a 2012 published report, Uganda was considering the use of nuclear energy for electricity generation.

Subministries
 State Minister for Mineral Development, currently Hon. Peter Lokeris
 State Minister for Energy, currently Hon.Sidronius Okaasai Opolot

Upcoming projects
It is expected that after Isimba and Karuma come on-line, construction of Ayago Power Station will begin. Uganda is increasingly developing other energy sources besides hydroelectricity, including evaluation of nuclear energy. The energy generated is expected to be used internally through the expansion of electricity access in Uganda from estimated 20 percent in 2016 (about 900,000 subscribers) to 40 percent in 2020 (about 3 million subscribers). Any surplus energy is expected to be sold to neighboring countries including South Sudan and DR Congo.

List of ministers
 Ruth Nankabirwa (8 June 2021 - present)
 Mary Goretti Kitutu (14 December 2019 - 8 June 2021)
 Irene Muloni (27 May 2011 - 14 December 2019)
 Hilary Onek (16 February 2009 - 27 May 2011)
 Daudi Migereko (1 June 2006 - 16 February 2009)
 Syda Bbumba (2002 - 1 June 2006)

Auxiliary institutions and allied agencies
 Electricity Regulatory Authority (Uganda)
 Uganda Electricity Generation Company Limited
 Uganda Electricity Transmission Company Limited
 Uganda Electricity Distribution Company Limited
 Umeme Limited
 Rural Electrification Agency
 Uganda Energy Credit Capitalisation Company
 Petroleum Authority of Uganda
 Uganda National Oil Company
 Uganda Oil Refinery
 Uganda Atomic Energy Council

See also

Energy in Uganda
Government of Uganda
Cabinet of Uganda

References

External links
Status Report On Some of the Major Projects Currently In Development - September 2015
 Website of Ministry of Energy and Mineral Development

Government ministries of Uganda
Energy in Uganda
Uganda
Organisations based in Kampala